David Newton Eagleson (October 4, 1924 – May 23, 2003) was an American lawyer who served as an associate justice of the Supreme Court of California from 1987 to 1991.

Biography
Eagleson was born in Los Angeles, California, and educated in the public schools. After serving in World War II, Eagleson earned his law degree from the USC Law School in 1950. On June 6, 1951, he was admitted to the State Bar of California. Eagleson then practiced law in Long Beach, California for 20 years.

In December 1970, Governor Ronald Reagan appointed Eagleson to the Los Angeles County Superior Court, where from 1980 to 1981 he served as presiding judge. From 1979 to 1980, he was president of the California Judges Association. In November 1981, Governor George Deukmejian named Eagleson as an associate justice to the Court of Appeal, Second District, Division Five.

In March 1987, Governor Deukmejian appointed Eagleson as an associate justice to the Supreme Court. A conservative Republican, Eagleson was elevated to the high court after voters removed liberal Chief Justice Rose Bird and two of her allies from the Court in the 1986 general election as a result of the trio's opposition to capital punishment. Eagleson tended to uphold capital sentences.  During his four years on the court, Eagleson wrote 54 majority opinions. Among Eagleson's notable opinions is Thing v. La Chusa (1989), which sharply limited the availability of the cause of action for negligent infliction of emotional distress in California.

After stepping down from the high court, Eagleson practiced as a mediator and arbitrator in Los Angeles.

Personal life
On May 16, 1953, Eagleson married Virginia Mae Brown, and they had two daughters, Elizabeth K. Eagleson, an attorney, and Victoria Eagleson, who both reside in Southern California. Beth, in her eulogy for her father delivered before the court on which he once served, cited Thing as the opinion most representative of her father's voice and philosophy:

References

External links
 
 David N. Eagleson. California Supreme Court Historical Society.
 Photo of David N. Eagleson on the bench. Los Angeles, April 1987. California Supreme Court Historical Society Newsletter (Spring-Summer 2013), p. 20.
 
 Former Justices. California Court of Appeal, Second District.

See also
 List of justices of the Supreme Court of California

1924 births
2003 deaths
USC Gould School of Law alumni
People from Long Beach, California
Lawyers from Los Angeles
Superior court judges in the United States
California judges appointed by Ronald Reagan
Judges of the California Courts of Appeal
Justices of the Supreme Court of California
American military personnel of World War II
California Republicans
20th-century American judges
Deaths from cancer in California